Mary Emma Macintosh (died c. 1916) was a South African suffragist. She was the first President of the  Women's Enfranchisement Association of the Union.

Life 
She studied at the Huguenot College. She married a merchant, William MacIntosh. She was active in the Woman's Christian Temperance Union, the Guild of Loyal Women, and the Empire League.
Birth	31 Jul 1864
Death	2 Dec 1915 (aged 51)
Burial	
South End Cemetery
Port Elizabeth, Nelson Mandela Bay Metropolitan Municipality, Eastern Cape, South Africa
Memorial ID	140645835

References 

South African suffragists
1910s deaths
Year of death uncertain
Year of birth missing
Women's suffrage in South Africa

External links 

 Mary Emma MacIntosh, Find a grave,  South End Cemetery, Port Elizabeth,